Huacramarca or Waqramarka (possibly from Quechua waqra horn, marka village)  is an archaeological site on a mountain of the same name in Peru. Huacramarca lies southeast of Contrahierbas, near the village Huallin (located in the Ancash Region, Asunción Province, Chacas District).

Images

References 

Archaeological sites in Peru
Mountains of Peru
Archaeological sites in Ancash Region
Mountains of Ancash Region